Aurélien Agnan (born 20 April 1958) is a Beninese boxer. He competed in the 1980 Summer Olympics.

References

1958 births
Living people
Boxers at the 1980 Summer Olympics
Beninese male boxers
Olympic boxers of Benin
Light-welterweight boxers